Edward Ernest Bowen (30 March 1836 – 8 April 1901) was an influential schoolmaster at Harrow School from 1859 until his death, and the author of the Harrow school song, "Forty Years On".

Biography

Edward Bowen was born in Glenmore, County Wicklow, Ireland; his elder brother was Charles Bowen, a well-known judge. He was educated at Blackheath Proprietary School and King's College, London before entering Trinity College, Cambridge. He was appointed an assistant master at Marlborough College in 1858, and moved to Harrow in 1859.

As a schoolmaster, Bowen believed that boys must be interested in his lessons and at ease with him. This was in contrast with the grave formality typical of the Victorian era. He was the founder of the "modern side" at Harrow, which gave prominence to subjects other than Latin and Greek.

Bowen was also an enthusiastic sportsman and pedestrian. As a Cambridge undergraduate he walked the 90 miles from Cambridge to Oxford in 26 hours; at Harrow, he was the first master to identify himself thoroughly with sports and games;  and he was involved in the establishment of the English Football Association, also playing in and winning the first FA Cup Final in 1872 and winning the trophy again in 1873 with Wanderers F.C.  Bowen also played one English County Cricket match for Hampshire, in 1864, but was dismissed for a duck both times.

Bowen is perhaps best remembered as the author of the Harrow school song, "Forty Years On", which is still sung today, and to which an extra verse was later added in honour of Winston Churchill.  He also wrote many other Harrow School songs along with the then Master in Charge of Music, many of which are sung by the school to this day at occasions known as songs every term. While at Harrow, he was housemaster of The Grove boarding house.

He died at Moux, Côte-d'Or, France. Cyril Norwood said of him that he had "kept the eternal boy alive within his own breast to the very end".

References

External links
 

1836 births
1901 deaths
Alumni of King's College London
Alumni of Trinity College, Cambridge
Association football forwards
England v Scotland representative footballers (1870–1872)
English cricketers
FA Cup Final players
Hampshire cricketers
Irish association footballers (before 1923)
Irish cricketers
People educated at Blackheath Proprietary School
People from Blessington
Schoolteachers from London
Wanderers F.C. players